The Aigue Blanche (also spelled: Aygue Blanche) is a short mountain river that flows through the Provence-Alpes-Côte d'Azur region of southeastern France. It lies completely within the department of Alpes-Maritimes and crosses three communes: Guillaumes, Beuil, and Péone.

Its source is in the Maritime Alps, and it flows into the river Tuébi, a tributary of the Var, in the village Péone.

References

Rivers of France
Rivers of Alpes-Maritimes
Rivers of Provence-Alpes-Côte d'Azur